John Ross Matheson,  (November 14, 1917 – December 27, 2013) was a Canadian politician, lawyer, and judge who helped develop both the national flag of Canada and the Order of Canada.

Early life 
John Matheson was born in Arundel, Quebec, the son of the Reverend Dr. A. Dawson Matheson and his wife Gertrude Matheson (née McCuaig). Matheson underwent training at the Royal Military College of Canada in 1936.
He graduated from Queen's University in 1940, winning the prestigious Tricolour Award in that year for distinguished achievement.

Military career 
Matheson served as an officer with the 1st Field Regiment, Royal Canadian Horse Artillery, 1st Canadian Infantry Division in Italy during World War II. He was the only officer in this regiment to survive the war.

Matheson participated in the Battle of Ortona, where an air bursting German shell sent shrapnel into his head and caused damage similar to a stroke. He was left paralyzed from the neck down and unable to speak. He recovered after returning to Canada, but never regained the use of his right leg. His injuries caused him lifelong pain, and afterwards, he usually walked with the assistance of a cane.

Matheson held honorary militia appointments with the 30th Field Artillery Regiment, Royal Regiment of Canadian Artillery from 1972 to 1982. Afterwards, he retired with the rank of Colonel.

Family and legal career 
After the war, Matheson met Edith Bickley, a radiologist's assistant, in St. Anne de Bellevue Hospital in Montreal, Quebec.  He said they would never have met if she hadn’t been such a curious nurse. The couple married and eventually had six children. He received a Bachelor of Laws degree from Osgoode Hall Law School, a Master of Arts degree from Mount Allison University, and a Master of Laws degree from the University of Western Ontario. He was called to the Bar of Ontario in 1948 and was created a Queen's Counsel in 1967. He practiced law with the firm of Matheson, Henderson & Hart in Brockville, Ontario. A member of the United Church of Canada, Matheson resided in Kingston, Ontario until his death in December 2013.

Political career 
John Matheson was elected as a Liberal Member of Parliament in the Ontario riding of Leeds in a 1961 by-election. He was re-elected in 1962, 1963, and 1965.

Matheson lost his seat in Parliament when he was defeated by 4 votes (a margin of 0.0137%) in the 1968 Federal Election. This was the first election after the riding of Leeds absorbed the traditionally conservative-voting townships of North Burgess, North Elmsley and Montague. He was the only incumbent Liberal not to be re-elected in the 1968 "Trudeaumania" election.

Matheson was a leading member of the multi-party parliamentary committee whose mandate was to select a new flag design for Canada. He and Dr. George Stanley (then Dean of Arts at the Royal Military College) collaborated on the design which was ultimately approved by Parliament and by Royal Proclamation adopted as the National Flag of Canada as of the 15th of February 1965. Matheson wrote a book, Canada's Flag: A Search for a Country, about the creation of the new flag.

Matheson later played an important role in the creation of the Order of Canada, as one of its founders. He also influenced the design of the order's insignia, created by Bruce W. Beatty.

Matheson was portrayed by Peter MacNeill in a Heritage Minute television commercial about his involvement in the Flag committee.

Judicial appointment 
In 1968, Matheson was appointed a judge of the Judicial District of Ottawa-Carleton. In 1984, he was appointed a judge of the County Court of Lanark. In 1985, he was appointed a judge of the District Court of Ontario. From 1990 to 1992, he was a justice of the Ontario Court of Justice (General Division).

One of Matheson's most notable decisions was in Clark v. Clark, a case that heavily influenced the law regarding the capacity of differently-abled persons. Matheson ruled that 20-year-old Justin Clark, who suffered from cerebral palsy, was mentally competent to make his own decisions and should not be forced into the guardianship of his parents. The case has been described as "a pivotal moment in the Canadian disability rights movement" and lead to a widespread re-examination of provincial guardianship laws. Matheson later described giving this decision as his proudest moment.

Honours 
 Officer of the Order of Canada (1993)
 Inaugural recipient of the Distinguished Service Award from the Canadian Association of Former Parliamentarians, awarded to a former parliamentarian "who has made an outstanding contribution to the country and its democratic institutions." (1999) 
 Knight of Justice Venerable Order of Saint John
 Knight Commander of Merit Order of Saint Lazarus
 Canadian Centennial Medal (1967)
 Queen Elizabeth II Silver Jubilee Medal (1977)
 125th Anniversary of the Confederation of Canada Medal (1992)
 Queen Elizabeth II Golden Jubilee Medal (2002)
 Queen Elizabeth II Diamond Jubilee Medal (2012)
 Canadian Forces Decoration (1977)

Memorials
The John Matheson Sword is awarded annually to the Preparatory Year cadet at the Royal Military College Saint-Jean who achieved the highest results in all four components of the College’s program, namely Academics, Leadership, Athletics and Bilingualism.

References

External links
 
 
 "The maple leaf has symbolized Canada for 50 years, but its origins are still misunderstood," National Post, 15 December 2014

1917 births
2013 deaths
Canadian non-fiction writers
Knights of Justice of the Order of St John
Liberal Party of Canada MPs
Members of the House of Commons of Canada from Ontario
Members of the United Church of Canada
Fellows of the Royal Heraldry Society of Canada
Flag designers
Judges in Ontario
Lawyers in Ontario
Canadian lawyers
Canadian King's Counsel
Officers of the Order of Canada
Queen's University at Kingston alumni
Mount Allison University alumni
University of Western Ontario alumni
People from Brockville
Western Law School alumni
Osgoode Hall Law School alumni
People from Laurentides
Anglophone Quebec people
Canadian Army personnel of World War II
Canadian Army officers
Royal Regiment of Canadian Artillery officers
Royal Military College of Canada alumni